Mitakinskaya is a stanitsa in the Tarasovsky District of Rostov Oblast, Russia.

Geography 
The stanitsa is located on the left bank of the Donets, bordered by Ukraine to the west.

History 
In 1917 the village had 28,000 people.

On 21 February 2022, during the Russo-Ukrainian War, Russia claimed that five Ukrainian saboteurs were killed by Russian soldiers in Mitakinskaya.

References

External links 

 Mityakinskaya (village)  (Archive)
 Objects of cultural heritage on the territory of the Tarasovsky district 

Rostov Oblast articles missing geocoordinate data
Rural localities in Rostov Oblast
Don Host Oblast